The Shakey's V-League 13th Season Open Conference was the 25th conference of the Shakey's V-League and the first conference for its 13th season. The conference commenced on May 22, 2016 with an opening ceremony at the Filoil Flying V Centre, San Juan. The first games were on May 28, 2016, also at the same venue.

The previous season's conference champion, PLDT Home Ultera Ultra Fast Hitters, and runner-up Philippine Army Lady Troopers, decided to forgo their participation in this year's Open Conference.

There were eight (8) competing teams for this conference: NU Lady Bulldogs, UP Lady Maroons, Pocari Sweat, Team Laoag, Team Baguio, Team Iriga, Bali Pure and Philippine Air Force Air Spikers.

ABS-CBN Sports+Action is covering the games live on television.

Participating Teams

Team's Line-ups

Format
Preliminaries
Single round robin preliminary
Semifinals
Top four teams after preliminary round will enter semifinal round
Best-of-three series
Finals
Best-of-three series for the Final and Bronze matches

Preliminary round
All preliminary round games of the conference will be held at the Filoil Flying V Centre, San Juan, except for the matches on June 18 which will be held at the Blue Eagle Gym, Quezon City and those on June 25 and 27 which will be at the Philsports Arena, Pasig.

All times are Philippine Standard Time (UTC+08:00)

Playoff round
 Ranking is based from the preliminary round.

Semifinals

Rank 1 vs Rank 4

Rank 2 vs Rank 3

Bronze match

Finals

Awards

Most Valuable Player (Finals)
 Myla Pablo (Pocari Sweat)
Most Valuable Player (Conference)
 Grethcel Soltones (Bali Pure)
Best Setter
 Wendy Semana (Air Force)
Best Outside Spikers
 Alyssa Valdez (BaliPure)
 Myla Pablo (Pocari Sweat)
Best Middle Blockers
 Alyja Daphne Santiago (NU)
 Kathy Bersola (UP)
Best Opposite Spiker
 Michele Gumabao (Pocari Sweat)
Best Libero
 Melissa Gohing (Pocari Sweat)

See also
 Spikers' Turf 2nd Season Open Conference
 2016 PSL All-Filipino Conference

References

External links
 www.v-league.ph - Official website

Shakey's V-League conferences
2016 in Philippine sport